Corradi is an Italian surname. Notable people with the surname include:

Ana Corradi (born 1962), Argentine politician
Bernardo Corradi (born 1976), Italian footballer
Clorinda Corradi (1804–1877), Italian opera singer
Ernesto Corradi, Italian modern pentathlete
Giulio Cesare Corradi, 17th-century Italian opera librettist
Giuseppe Corradi (1932–2002), Italian footballer and manager
Mattia Corradi (born 1990), Italian footballer
Nelly Corradi (1914–1968), Italian opera singer and actress
Orlando Corradi, Italian film director
Roberto Corradi (born 1975), Italian footballer

Italian-language surnames